The State vs. Jolly LL.B 2, better known as Jolly LL.B 2, is a 2017 Indian Hindi-language black comedy film written and directed by Subhash Kapoor. Akshay Kumar plays the titular character, Jagdishwar Mishra, replacing the 2013 film's lead actor, Arshad Warsi, while Huma Qureshi, Annu Kapoor and Kumud Mishra, as well as Saurabh Shukla, who reprises his role from the 2013 original, star. The film is based in Lucknow, the story follows a lawyer who fights a case against a ruthless and powerful advocate to bring justice to the deceased victim of a fake encounter involving a corrupt police officer.

A third instalment of the franchise has been planned, with Akshay Kumar, Arshad Warsi and Saurabh Shukla returning in the key roles.

Plot
Jagdishwar "Jolly" Mishra (Akshay Kumar) is a Lucknow-based lawyer, who stays with his wife Pushpa (Huma Qureshi) and son. Despite being a lawyer, he works as a menial assistant to one of the most famous lawyers of Lucknow, Mr. Rizvi, for whom his father had worked as an assistant 30 years long. He is street smart and dreams of his own law chamber. Seeking to arrange money for his own chamber, Jolly lies to a widow, Hina Qasim, telling her that Mr. Rizvi will take her case and that the fee is 200,000 rupees. When Hina finds out that Jolly lied to her, she commits suicide. Jolly soon discovers that Hina's husband Iqbal Qasim was killed in a fake encounter on 13 August 2015, the very next day of their marriage, by Inspector Suryaveer Singh, who depicted him as Mohammed Iqbal Quadri, a terrorist, in official documents. Singh also shot a fellow constable, Baldev Singh Bhadauria, in order to show the encounter as genuine, leading to his death.

Filled with guilt, Jolly decides to fight Hina's case & files a PIL. Singh then hires Lucknow's best lawyer Pramod Mathur (Annu Kapoor) to fight his case. After reprimanding Jolly for his mistakes in filing the PIL and no credible evidence, Justice Sunderlal Tripathi (Saurabh Shukla) gives a date for hearing and warns Jolly to collect some evidence before the hearing.

Jolly is able to get a copy of the FIR and other papers regarding the case with the help of a bookie, Guru Ji, in Varanasi by paying him a sum of 500,000 by selling his own chamber. Later he is able to track Ram Kumar Bhadauria, the son of the constable who died in the fake encounter. This backfires as Mathur uses his power and money to tamper with the narco test video of the witness. However, even though Justice Tripathi orders disciplinary action against Jolly for showing allegedly dishonest evidence, the Chairman of the Discipline Committee, who turns out to be Mr. Rizvi himself, gives Jolly four days of time to prove himself correct, as he also feels guilty for not fighting the case himself.

Jolly and Pushpa, while analyzing the wedding album of Hina and Iqbal Qasim, notice an unknown cop from Kashmir called Fahim Bhat. Jolly travels to Kashmir and gets confirmation of the truth from Fahim,who visited Lucknow to identify the terrorist during Iqbal Qasim and Hina's wedding. Fahim, now suspended and arrested in a fake case, reveals that Qasim, who died in the encounter, was not the real terrorist and that he also filed a complaint against Singh. Jolly flees with Fahim to Lucknow. Meanwhile, Jolly coaxes the police commissioner V.K Paul to tell the truth or else he will file a PIL against all the encounters done by him. Mathur tries his best to avoid Fahim from giving a statement in the court as he stops the proceedings in the courtroom by sitting on the floor in protest. Justice Tripathi also sits on the floor, refusing to be swayed by Mathur's tactics.

At midnight, Justice Tripathi ignores Mathur's plea and decides to carry on the proceedings. After Fahim's statement, Jolly, with help from Paul, presents Quadri, who fakes his identity as a Brahmin Pandit. After initial reluctance from Justice Tripathi, Jolly rapidly fires questions to Iqbal by asking him details of the Shastras. Iqbal finally admits that he is the terrorist, Quadri, and had bribed Singh to set him free. Justice Tripathi then declares Iqbal Qasim innocent and orders Quadri's arrest, giving life imprisonment to Singh along with his accomplices on charges of murder, erasing evidence, misleading the court and showing false evidences as Jolly wins the case.

Cast

 Akshay Kumar as Advocate Jagdishwar "Jolly" Mishra
 Huma Qureshi as Pushpa Mishra (née Pandey), Jolly's wife
 Saurabh Shukla as Judge Sunderlal Tripathi, a judge transferred from Delhi High Court, who knows another person with the same name as Jolly (Arshad Warsi); Shukla reprises his role from Jolly LLB
 Annu Kapoor as Advocate Pramod Mathur
 Ram Gopal Bajaj as Mr. Rizvi, Jolly's boss and senior advocate
 Kumud Mishra as Inspector Suryaveer Singh
 Sayani Gupta as Hina Qasim née Siddiqui, Iqbal's lover and later wife
 Manav Kaul as Iqbal Qasim
 Inaamulhaq as Mohammed Iqbal Quadri, who masquerades as Pandit Ramkrishan Premkrishan Saraswat in court
 Sitaram Panchal as Sitaram, the farmer
 Sanjay Mishra as Guru Ji
 Brijendra Kala as Shiv Kumar Dubey, the man who arranges chamber for Jolly
 V.M. Badola as Mr. Mishra, Jolly's father
 Rajiv Gupta as Birbal, Jolly's assistant
 Vinod Nagpal as Zahoor Siddiqui, Hina's father
 Avijit Dutt as Commissioner V.K. Paul
 Brijesh Sharma as CBI Officer Nair
 Sudhanva Deshpande as CBI Officer Basu
 Sunil Kumar Palwal as Fahim Bhat, a Kashmir Police Constable
 Saurabh Agnihotri as Gul Mohammad	
 Saran Tiwari as Tripathi's nephew
 Shubhangi Latkar as Dr. Hema Deshpande, the narco specialist
 Zia Ahmed as Reporter
 Tarun Kumar as Baldev Singh Bhadaria
 Dadhi Pandey as Siraj Alam
 Sushil Pandey  as Ram Kumar Bhadauria		
 A.R. Rama as Mushtaq, Mathur's assistant
 Yakub Sayed as Jugal Kishore Mathur, Mathur's father
 Gurpal Singh as Judge Harbhajan Singh
 Rati Shankar Tripathi as Chacha in the opening mass cheating scene
 Mir Sarwar as Kashmir Police Inspector Hidayat Baig
 Ajay Singh as Rizvi's assistant

Production

Casting
The film was announced in July 2016, where the lead actor Akshay Kumar had revealed his first look for the film. It was reported that Arshad Warsi, who played the lead role in the previous installment, was replaced by Kumar. Actress Huma Qureshi was signed as the female lead, pairing opposite Kumar. Annu Kapoor was signed as the antagonist of the film pitted against Kumar.

Development
Principal photography of the film began in Mumbai. The major parts of the film were shot in Lucknow in a one-month schedule. It was further reported that the first schedule was completed in September 2016. The second schedule was shot in Varanasi in later September 2016. A stunt sequence was shot in Ganga river, where Kumar declined to use a stunt double. The final schedule of the film was shot in Manali, Himachal Pradesh in October 2016. Kumar shot his scenes in a time span of 30 days. A promotional song was shot in Mumbai in December 2016.

Criticism

Depiction of Indian judicial system
The film's title and depiction of the Indian legal system created a controversy. Advocate Ajaykumar Waghmare filed a case at the Bombay High Court for removal of the word LLB and stated that the use of the word is a "deliberate attempt" to insult the Indian legal system. The Bombay High Court appointed a 3-member committee to examine the content of the film. The Supreme Court of India also appointed a 3-member panel, consisting of Chief Justice J. S. Khehar and Justices N. V. Ramana and D. Y. Chandrachud, to review the film.

Lawsuit from Bata
The film's trailer had shown a derogate reference to Bata Shoes, a shoe brand. The CBFC had edited out the reference to the brand with respect to the filed lawsuit.

Ban
The film is banned in Pakistan, Central Board of Film Censors of Pakistan had objected some scenes related to the terrorism issues in Jammu and Kashmir.

Release
The film was released on 10 February 2017, prior to the release of the film, the CBFC had passed the film without any cuts. film is originally scheduled to release on 20 October 2016.

Soundtrack

The music for the film is composed by Manj Musik, Meet Bros, Vishal Khurana and Chirantan Bhatt while the lyrics have been written by Shabbir Ahmed, Junaid Wasi, Manj Musik and Raftaar. The song "Jolly Good Fellow" incorporates lyrics from the English folk song "For He's a Jolly Good Fellow". The full movie soundtrack was released on 13 January 2017 and it consists of four songs which includes one Qawaali song too. The music rights are acquired by T-Series.

Box office

Domestic
The film opened with a domestic collection of 132.0 million becoming Akshay Kumar's eighth highest opener and second highest of the year following Raees. The film shown growth in next two days collecting 17.31 crores and 19.95 crores on second and third day of release respectively and took its first domestic weekend collection to a total of 504.6 million. It became second highest first weekend collecting Bollywood film of the year after Raees. Its cumulative collection in next four days evaluated to 26.25 crores and with that, the film scored first domestic week of 777.1 million. After Raees, Jolly LLB 2 is second highest domestic first week collecting film of 2017. As of 2 March, the film has collected  1172.4 million domestically And It Declared As Superhit By BOI.

Overseas
The film collected 134.0 million from overseas during first week which is second highest for a Bollywood film of 2017.

Awards and nominations

Sequel
After the success of the second installment, makers have confirmed to make a third part of this franchise. The film is titled Jolly LLB vs Jolly LLB, with both Akshay Kumar and Arshad Warsi reprising their roles of Jolly along with Shukla reprising his role.

References

External links
 
 
 
 
 Free LLB Notes for learners

2017 films
Films scored by Chirantan Bhatt
Films scored by Meet Bros Anjjan
Films scored by Manj Musik
Films shot in Lucknow
Indian legal films
Indian sequel films
Indian comedy-drama films
2010s Hindi-language films
Films shot in Uttar Pradesh
Films shot in Jammu and Kashmir
Indian black comedy films
Indian satirical films
Fictional portrayals of police departments in India
Films set in Lucknow
Films shot in Manali, Himachal Pradesh
Films shot in Himachal Pradesh
Fox Star Studios films
Indian courtroom films
Fictional portrayals of the Uttar Pradesh Police
Films directed by Subhash Kapoor